The Embassy of Ireland in Berlin (German: Botschaft von Irland) is the diplomatic mission of Ireland to Germany. It is located at 51 Jägerstraße since 2009.

The current Ambassador to Germany is Dr. Nicholas O’Brien who has served in this role since August 2019. He previously served as the Deputy Ambassador to the Federal Republic of Germany.

Embassy History 
The first Irish diplomatic mission in Germany was established in 1929 on Drakestraße, near Tiergarten. This building was destroyed in an air-raid during World War II.

In 1951, Ireland opened an Embassy in Bonn, which was the de facto capital of West Germany. This embassy was eventually moved to Friedrichstraße, Berlin in 2000 after German Reunification.

Building 
The embassy occupies part of 51 Jägerstraße. This building was built by the Mendelssohn family in 1789. In 1939 it was, along with a number of other buildings on Jägerstraße, forcibly sold to the German Reich.

List of Ambassadors
Daniel A. Binchy 1929-1932
Leo T. McCauley 1932-1933
Charles Bewley 1933-1939
William Warnock 1939-1944
Cornelius Cremin 1944-1945
John A. Belton 1951-1955
Dr. Thomas Joseph ("Tommy", "T.J.") Kiernan 1955-1956
William Warnock 1956-1962
Brian Gallagher 1962-1964
Eamonn Kennedy	1964-1970
Paul Keating	1970-1972
Seán Ronan	1972-1973
Robert McDonagh 1973-1976
Christopher P (Robin) Fogarty	1976-1983
John Campbell	1983-1986
Kester Heaslip	1986-1991
Pádraig Murphy	1991-1998
Noel Fahey	1998-2002
Seán Ó hUiginn	2002-2006
David Donoghue	2006-2009
Dan Mulhall 2009-2013
Michael Collins 2013-2019
Dr. Nicholas O'Brien 2019-to date

See also 
 Foreign relations of Germany
 Foreign relations of the Republic of Ireland
 List of diplomatic missions of the Republic of Ireland

References 

Diplomatic missions of the Republic of Ireland
Germany–Ireland relations
Germany